Heathfield School may refer to one of several schools in England:

 Heathfield School, Ascot, previously Heathfield St Mary's School
 Heathfield School, Pinner, one of the Girls' Day School Trust schools
 Heathfield Knoll School, Wolverley, near Kidderminster